Tabeau is an unincorporated community in Lafayette County, in the U.S. state of Missouri.

Tabeau derives its name from nearby Tabo Creek.

References

Unincorporated communities in Lafayette County, Missouri
Unincorporated communities in Missouri